The Woking News and Mail (incorporating the Woking Review) is a weekly local paper, which is published in the Surrey village of Knaphill in Woking.

The newspaper is published every Thursday and principally covers Woking and the villages of Horsell, Chobham, Knaphill Kingfield, Brookwood, Old Woking, West Byfleet, SheerwaterSutton Green Woodham and Bisley.

History 
The first copy of the Woking News and Mail was published in 1894. It ran for 117 years, before the Guardian Media Group decided to cease publishing the print edition in March 2011. However, the Warm Welcome Group, owned by ex-Guardian and Woking News & Mail employee Philip Davies, secured the rights to publish the paper in May 2011, and it has maintained a healthy editorial schedule since.

In October 2016, the News and Mail produced its first dedicated front page for its Chobham News and Mail edition, and saw its readership steadily increase between 2016 and 2019 at a time when other local and regional newspaper titles experienced a slump in sales.

In October 2022, the paper was sold to British multimedia company, Tindle Newspapers, for an undisclosed sum to help strengthen its presence in the Surrey region.

References

External links
 

Newspapers published in Surrey
Publications established in 1894
1894 establishments in England